The Windward Performance Perlan 2 is an American mid-wing, two-seats-in-tandem, pressurized, experimental research glider that was designed by Greg Cole and built by Windward Performance for the Perlan Project.

The aircraft first flew on 23 September 2015 at Redmond Municipal Airport, Oregon.

Design and development
The Perlan 2 is a follow-up design to the successful Perlan 1 and has as its design goal a flight exceeding  in altitude. The project's goals include science, engineering and education. The aircraft will be used to study the northern polar vortex and its influence on global weather patterns. The program also hopes to beat the 85,069 ft altitude record set in 1975 by a SR-71.

The aircraft is made from composites. Its  span wing has a high aspect ratio of 27.1 and is equipped with airbrakes. The pressurization system produces an 8.5 psi differential, and the two-person crew will not wear pressure suits. The landing gear is a non-retractable monowheel gear. Because the aircraft will operate at extreme altitudes, in only 3% of sea level atmospheric pressure, it will also be flying at true airspeeds in excess of 0.5 Mach. The aircraft was designed to minimize flutter and manage shock wave formation.

Fossett was killed in a light aircraft crash a year later and the project floundered without funding. Since then more than US$2.8M has been raised to build the Perlan 2, including a donation from Dennis Tito. In November 2013, a crowd-funding effort was undertaken. In August 2014 Airbus became a partner in the project.

The Perlan 2 first flew in 2015 and started with flights in the U.S. Sierra Nevada mountain wave. The record setting and research flights started in southern Argentina in 2016, by Einar Envoldson or Perrenod using rebreather oxygen systems. The aircraft was displayed at AirVenture in July 2015.

Specifications (Perlan 2)

See also

References

External links

2010s United States experimental aircraft
Aircraft first flown in 2015
2010s United States sailplanes